John Joseph Donahoe II (born April 30, 1960) is an American businessman who is the CEO of Nike. Early in his career he worked for Bain & Company, becoming the firm's president and CEO in 1999. He is on the board of directors at Nike, The Bridgespan Group  and is chairman of PayPal. Donahoe was named president and CEO of ServiceNow, a cloud company, in February 2017. 
He was on the Board of Trustees of Dartmouth College from 2003 to 2012. On January 13, 2020, Donahoe became president and CEO of Nike.

Early life and education
John Donahoe was born in Evanston, Illinois on April 30, 1960. His father was an accountant at Price Waterhouse in Chicago. In 1978, he graduated from New Trier High School in Winnetka, Illinois. He earned a bachelor's degree in economics from Dartmouth College, followed by an MBA from Stanford Graduate School of Business. Donahoe is of Irish descent.

Career

After his senior year of high school, a friend's father asked him to work at his Schlitz beer distribution company. "You'll make good money," he said. It was a union job and the first requirement was that he join the International Brotherhood of Teamsters.

Before joining eBay he worked for Bain & Company (a worldwide consulting firm based in Boston) for 20 years, starting as an associate consultant and rising to become the firm's president and CEO in 1999.

In March 2005 he was hired as president of eBay Marketplaces. His role was to focus on eBay's core business, which accounts for a large percentage of the company's revenues. In 2008, He was appointed CEO of eBay. He made more than forty acquisitions, including Shopping.com and StubHub, and the classifieds sites Gumtree and LoQUo, and most recently, Shutl. After his departure from eBay in 2015, Donahoe was replaced by eBay Marketplaces president, Devin Wenig.

In February 2017, he was announced as the president and CEO of ServiceNow, a software company that he became familiar with while working at eBay.

He was on the Board of Trustees of Dartmouth College from 2003 to 2012.

In October 2019, he was announced as the next CEO of Nike, and succeeded Mark Parker on January 13, 2020.

Political activism
Donahoe has contributed to both of the main US parties. He contributed to Republican Congressman David Dreier of California. He also supported two Democratic Senate candidates, Kirsten Gillibrand of New York, and Barbara Boxer of California.

Personal life 
He is married to Eileen Donahoe (née Chamberlain), former U.S. Ambassador to the United Nations Human Rights Council in Geneva, Switzerland. They have four children; three sons and a daughter, and live in Portola Valley, California.

References

External links

Biography at eBay's corporate site
John J. Donahoe Forbes Profile

1960 births
American chairpersons of corporations
American corporate directors
American technology chief executives
Businesspeople in online retailing
Dartmouth College alumni
EBay employees
Living people
Stanford Graduate School of Business alumni
Bain & Company employees
Businesspeople from Evanston, Illinois
People from Portola Valley, California
PayPal people
New Trier High School alumni